Cloudscape may refer to:

Cloudscape (art), a depiction of clouds or sky
Cloudscape photography, a photographic view of clouds or sky
Cloudscape (band), a progressive metal band from Sweden
Cloudscape (album), Cloudscape's self-titled debut album
Cloudscape, previous name of Apache Derby, a relational database management system